Vurgu i Ri (romanized: Kainoúrgio/Kainoúrio) is a village in Vlorë County, southern Albania. At the 2015 local government reform it became part of the municipality of Finiq. According to Leonidas Kallivretakis, it is inhabited solely by Greeks.

Demographics 
In the Defter of the Sanjak of Delvinë from 1431-1432, 4 villages in the area of Vurgu are recorded: Finiki (Finiqi), Vurgo, Jeromi and Krajna, each with very few inhabitants. Among these villages, in the Ottoman register mentioned above typical Albanian names are attested, such as: Gjin, Reçi, Leka, Gjon, Dorza, Meksh Nika and Deda. 

According to Ottoman statistics, the village had 72 inhabitants in 1895. The village had 460 inhabitants in 1993, all ethnically Greeks.

References

External links 
Photo compilation depicting the village

Villages in Vlorë County
Greek communities in Albania